SAMV (iterative sparse asymptotic minimum variance) is a parameter-free superresolution algorithm for the linear inverse problem in spectral estimation, direction-of-arrival (DOA) estimation and tomographic reconstruction with applications in signal processing, medical imaging and remote sensing. The name was coined in 2013 to emphasize its basis on the asymptotically minimum variance (AMV) criterion. It is a powerful tool for the recovery of both the amplitude and frequency characteristics of multiple highly correlated sources in challenging environments (e.g., limited number of snapshots and low signal-to-noise ratio). Applications include synthetic-aperture radar, computed tomography scan, and magnetic resonance imaging (MRI).

Definition 
The formulation of the SAMV algorithm is given as an inverse problem in the context of DOA estimation. Suppose an -element uniform linear array (ULA) receive  narrow band signals emitted from sources located at locations , respectively. The sensors in the ULA accumulates  snapshots over a specific time. The  dimensional snapshot vectors are

 

Assume that , where  is the Dirac delta and it equals to 1 only if  and 0 otherwise. Let  be a vector containing the unknown signal powers and noise variance, .

 

This covariance matrix can be traditionally estimated by the sample covariance matrix  where . After applying the vectorization operator to the matrix , the obtained vector  is linearly related to the unknown parameter  as

,

where 
is the Kronecker product.

SAMV algorithm 
To estimate the parameter  from the statistic , we develop a series of iterative SAMV approaches based on the asymptotically minimum variance criterion. From, the covariance matrix  of an arbitrary consistent estimator of  based on the second-order statistic  is bounded by the real symmetric positive definite matrix

 

where . In addition, this lower bound is attained by the covariance matrix of the asymptotic distribution of  obtained by minimizing,

 

where

Therefore, the estimate of  can be obtained iteratively.

The  and  that minimize  can be computed as follows. Assume  and  have been approximated to a certain degree in the th iteration, they can be refined at the th iteration by,

 

 

Beyond scanning grid accuracy
The resolution of most compressed sensing based source localization techniques is limited by the fineness of the direction grid that covers the location parameter space. In the sparse signal recovery model, the sparsity of the truth signal  is dependent on the distance between the adjacent element in the overcomplete dictionary , therefore, the difficulty of choosing the optimum overcomplete dictionary arises. The computational complexity is directly proportional to the fineness of the direction grid, a highly dense grid is not computational practical. To overcome this resolution limitation imposed by the grid, the grid-free SAMV-SML (iterative Sparse Asymptotic Minimum Variance - Stochastic Maximum Likelihood) is proposed, which refine the location estimates  by iteratively minimizing a stochastic maximum likelihood cost function with respect to a single scalar parameter .

Application to range-Doppler imaging

A typical application with the SAMV algorithm in SISO radar/sonar range-Doppler imaging problem. This imaging problem is a single-snapshot application, and algorithms compatible with single-snapshot estimation are included, i.e., matched filter (MF, similar to the periodogram or backprojection, which is often efficiently implemented as fast Fourier transform (FFT)), IAA, and a variant of the SAMV algorithm (SAMV-0). The simulation conditions are identical to: A -element polyphase pulse compression P3 code is employed as the transmitted pulse, and a total of nine moving targets are simulated. Of all the moving targets, three are of  dB power and the rest six are of  dB power. The received signals are assumed to be contaminated with uniform white Gaussian noise of  dB power.

The matched filter detection result suffers from severe smearing and leakage effects both in the Doppler and range domain, hence it is impossible to distinguish the  dB targets. On contrary, the IAA algorithm offers enhanced imaging results with observable target range estimates and Doppler frequencies. The SAMV-0 approach provides highly sparse result and eliminates the smearing effects completely, but it misses the weak  dB targets.

Open source implementation
An open source MATLAB implementation of SAMV algorithm could be downloaded here.

See also 

Array processing
Matched filter
Periodogram
Filtered backprojection (Radon transform)
MUltiple SIgnal Classification (MUSIC), a popular parametric superresolution method
Pulse-Doppler radar
Super-resolution imaging
Compressed sensing
Inverse problem
Tomographic reconstruction

References 

Signal estimation
Fourier analysis
Frequency-domain analysis
Trigonometry
Wave mechanics
Medical imaging
Inverse problems
Multidimensional signal processing
Signal processing
Tomography